Lokeren is a railway station in the town of Lokeren, East Flanders, Belgium. The station opened on 9 August 1847 and is located on the 57 and 59. The train services are operated by National Railway Company of Belgium (NMBS).

Train services
The station is served by the following services:

Intercity services (IC-02) Ostend - Bruges - Ghent - Sint-Niklaas - Antwerpen
Intercity services (IC-04) Lille/Poperinge - Kortrijk - Ghent - Sint-Niklaas - Antwerp
Intercity services (IC-20) Lokeren - Dendermonde - Brussels - Aalst - Ghent (weekends)
Intercity services (IC-26) Kortrijk - Tournai - Halle - Brussels - Dendermonde - Lokeren - Sint Niklaas (weekdays)
Intercity services (IC-28) Ghent - Sint-Niklaas - Antwerp (weekdays)
Local services (L-30) Lokeren - Sint-Niklaas - Antwerp

See also
 List of railway stations in Belgium

References

External links
 
 Lokeren railway station at Belgian Railways website

Railway stations in Belgium
Railway stations opened in 1847
Railway stations in East Flanders
1847 establishments in Belgium
Railway stations in the Republic of Ireland opened in 1847